Littoraria intermedia is a species of sea snail, a marine gastropod mollusk in the family Littorinidae, the winkles or periwinkles.

Distribution
Mangrove forests of Vietnam, Eritrea, Indian Ocean (Aldabra, Chagos), Madagascar, Mozambique, Mauritius, Seychelles, Tanzania (Indo-Pacific)

Description

Ecology
Littoraria intermedia is a predominantly mangrove-associated species.

References

 Philippi, R.A. (1846). Descriptions of a new species of Trochus, and of eighteen new species of Littorina, in the collection of H. Cuming, Esq. Proc. Zool. Soc. Lond. 13: 138–143 
 Reid, D.G. (1986). The littorinid molluscs of mangrove forests in the Indo-Pacific region. British Museum (Natural History), London.
 Steyn, D.G. & Lussi, M. (1998) Marine Shells of South Africa. An Illustrated Collector's Guide to Beached Shells. Ekogilde Publishers, Hartebeespoort, South Africa, ii + 264 pp.
 Reid, D.G. (2001). New data on the taxonomy and distribution of the genus Littoraria Griffith and Pidgeon, 1834 (Gastropoda: Littorinidae) in Indo-West Pacific mangrove forests. Nautilus. 115:115–139.
 Reid, D.G., Dyal, P., & Williams, S.T. (2010). Global diversification of mangrove fauna: a molecular phylogeny of Littoraria (Gastropoda: Littorinidae). Molecular Phylogenetics and Evolution. 55:185–201.

External links
 Reeve, L. A. (1857-1858). Monograph of the genus Littorina. In: Conchologia iconica, or, illustrations of the shells of molluscous animals, vol. 10, pls. 1-18 and unpaginated text. Reeve, London
 Reid D.G. (1989) The comparative morphology, phylogeny and evolution of the gastropod family Littorinidae. Philosophical Transactions of the Royal Society B 324: 1–110

Littorinidae
Gastropods described in 1846